The  was a licensed-produced version of the Fokker Super Universal transport built by Nakajima Aircraft Company in the 1930s. Initially used as an airliner, the militarized version was used by the Imperial Japanese Army in a variety of roles, ranging from medical evacuation to transport and training aircraft. It was used extensively in combat zones in Manchukuo and in China during the Second Sino-Japanese War.

Design and development
The Ki-6 originated as the Model 8 Super Universal, launched by Fokker in the United States in 1927 as a further development of its successful Fokker Universal. The Super Universal was slightly larger and could carry six passengers rather than four. In addition, the aircraft was equipped with a more powerful engine and a cantilever high-wing. In total, about 200 Super Universals are thought to have been built. Due to its rugged durability, long-range flight ability and large cargo capacity, the Fokker Super Universal was extensively used in bush flying and was well regarded for its versatility. The first flight took place in March 1928. Shortly after, the type entered production at a new factory in Glendale, California. The Super Universal remained in production until January 1931.

The Super Universal caught the attention of a number of civil airlines from 1928 onwards. There was also interest from the United States military, although no order was placed. Fokker received export orders from Colombia, Argentina, South Africa and Japan and a license production agreements were made with the Canadian subsidiary of Vickers and with Nakajima Aircraft Company in Japan.

Operational history
The first Super Universal was brought to Japan in components and was assembled by Nakajima for Japan Air Transport, the national airline of the Empire of Japan from 1928 to 1938. Under license production, Nakajima replaced the engine with a  Bristol Jupiter radial engine, also license-built in Japan, and later by its own Nakajima Kotobuki  engine.

Nakajima's production began in September 1930, with the first aircraft delivered in March 1931. Production ended in October 1936, but the total number of aircraft built is unknown. Nakajima also sub-licensed additional production to its subsidiary Manshūkoku Hikōki Seizo KK in Manchukuo, which also produced an unknown number of units.
The first military Super Universals were introduced into service following Japan's invasion of Manchuria in 1931 when the Imperial Japanese Army commandeered seven Super Universals from the Japan Air Transport Company.

In 1932, the Imperial Japanese Army Air Force decided to acquire its own transports, which it designated as the Army Type 95 Training Aircraft under the former aircraft naming nomenclature system, or Ki-6 under the new system. The first aircraft was delivered as a flying ambulance fitted with two stretchers and three seats. This was followed by an order for 20 trainers to be used for training pilots, gunners, bombardiers and wireless operators.

The Imperial Japanese Navy Air Service also ordered 20 Ki-6s, re-designating the aircraft as the Navy Fokker Land-Based Reconnaissance Aircraft or in short C2N1 when used for land-based operations and an additional 30 Navy Fokker Reconnaissance Seaplane or in short C2N2, which were fitted with a floatplane. The naval version had a larger cabin and was used on reconnaissance and military transport missions.

The aircraft built in Japan were used for both civil and military roles with some remaining in operation until after World War II.

Variants
 Nakajima Super Universal
 Civilian transport
 Ki-6 (Army Type 95 Training Aircraft)
 Military transport for the IJAAF
 C2N1 (Navy land-based reconnaissance aircraft)
 Land-based recon and military transport for the IJN
 C2N2 (Navy reconnaissance seaplane)
 Land-based recon and military transport for the IJN
 Manshū Super Universal
 Civil and military transport built in Manchukuo (Manchuria)

Operators

Civilian operators
 , the national airline of the Empire of Japan from 1928 to 1938.
 , the national airline of the Empire of Japan from 1938 to 1945.
 Manchukuo National Airways

Military operators
 Imperial Japanese Army Air Force
 Imperial Japanese Navy Air Service
 Manchukuo Air Force

Specifications (Ki-6)

See also

References

Bibliography

External links

 Fokker Aircraft site

High-wing aircraft
Ki-06, Nakajima
Ki-06, Nakajima
Ki-006
Single-engined tractor aircraft
Aircraft first flown in 1930